Mount Studencheskaya is a peak in the Jewish Autonomous Oblast, Russia. It is the highest point of the oblast.

Description
It rises in the Obluchensky District, on the northern part of the Jewish Autonomous Oblast, north of the valley of the Sutara, one of the rivers forming the Bira, a tributary of the Amur.

See also
 List of highest points of Russian federal subjects
 List of mountains and hills of Russia

References

External links
The Butterfly Fauna (Lepidoptera: Papilionoidea) of Jewish Autonomous Oblast (Russian Far East)

Studencheskaya
Landforms of the Jewish Autonomous Oblast

ceb:Mt. Studencheskaya